The Flying Fifty-Five is a 1922 sports mystery novel by the British writer Edgar Wallace set in the horse racing world.

Film adaptations
It has been adapted for films twice: a 1924 British silent film of the same title and a 1939 sound remake Flying Fifty-Five directed by Reginald Denham.

References

Bibliography
 Goble, Alan. The Complete Index to Literary Sources in Film. Walter de Gruyter, 1999.

1922 British novels
Novels by Edgar Wallace
British mystery novels
British sports novels
British novels adapted into films
Horse racing novels